Rapples Pan is a village in Kgalagadi District of Botswana.

Location
It is located at the south-western tip of Botswana, close to the South African border.

Education
It has a primary school.

Population
The population was recorded as 22283, by the 2011 census.

References

Kgalagadi District
Villages in Botswana